Grupo Axé Capoeira is an international Capoeira organization with headquarters in Vancouver. Founded in 1982 by Mestre Barrão in Recife, Brazil, it subsequently established academies throughout Canada, United States, Europe, Asia and South America. The school teaches Contemporary Capoeira (Capoeira Contemporânea). It has released multiple albums and DVDs, as well as performance videos.

References

External links
Axé Capoeira
Axé Capoeira Chicago, USA
Axé Capoeira Maryland, USA
Axé Capoeira UK
Axé Capoeira Türkiye
Axé Capoeira Victoria, CA
Axé Capoeira Richmond, CA
Axé Capoeira Calgary, CA
Axé Capoeira Comox, CA
Axé Capoeira Kansas City, USA
Axé Capoeira Angola

Capoeira
Capoeira organizations